Heo Tae-jeong (born 12 September 1965) is a South Korean politician, mayor of Daejeon.

Life
Heo Tae-jeong was born in Yesan County, South Chungcheong Province in 1965. He participated in a student movement while attending Chungnam National University.

Heo was appointed by President Roh Moo-hyun and served as a personnel administrator and social administrator of Blue House. And he served as policy advisor to Science and Technology Minister Oh Myeong.

Heo was elected as the head of the Yuseong District Office in 2010 and the mayor of Daejeon in 2018.

References

External links
 Official Website 
 Heo Tae-jeong's Blog
 Heo Tae-jeong's Twitter
 Heo Tae-jeong's YouTube
 Heo Tae-jeong's Facebook

1965 births
Living people
Minjoo Party of Korea politicians
People from South Chungcheong Province
Provincial governors of South Korea
Chungnam National University alumni